Scott Tereance Ellaway (born 8 August 1981) is a Welsh conductor and advocate for broadening access to classical music. In an article published by BBC Music Magazine in 2009, Ellaway became known for his entrepreneurial spirit as the founder and artistic director of Orchestra Europa. In 2011 John Spencer-Churchill, 11th Duke of Marlborough  hosted a concert at Blenheim Palace to celebrate the conductor's 30th birthday. Ellaway is founder of OpusYou, a music education firm that offers broadcast and E-learning options to students. He divides his time between New York City and Los Angeles, and is a Fellow at Jonathan Edwards College, Yale University.

Career

Born in Abergavenny, South Wales, Ellaway was educated locally before gaining an organ scholarship to Keble College, Oxford in 2002 and graduating in 2005  He made his professional conducting debut at age 21 with members of the BBC National Orchestra of Wales and the Welsh National Opera in Abergavenny. He has since worked with several prominent orchestras and ensembles including the Academy of Ancient Music, the BBC Singers, the Berliner Symphoniker, the Philharmonia Orchestra, the London Mozart Players, and performed at the Lincoln Center in New York City for the first time in 2014, conducting performances of George Balanchine's Concerto Barocco, Kammermusik No. 2 and Who Cares? for the New York City Ballet. He made his debut with the London Symphony Orchestra at the Henry Wood Hall in June 2016.

Discography
 Sweet, Sacred Feast! (2015), Oratory Choir of St Boniface, Brooklyn

References

Further reading
 Lisle, Nicola, "Stepping stone", Classical Music, October 25, 2008
 Franks, Rebecca, "Artists' Entrance", BBC Music Magazine, February, 2009
 Kropf, Annemarie, "Founding Father", Gig Magazine, July 2009
 "Blenheim celebrates conductor's Birthday", Cotswold Life, November 14, 2011

External links
 
 
 

1981 births
Living people
People from Abergavenny
Welsh conductors (music)
British male conductors (music)
Alumni of Keble College, Oxford
21st-century British conductors (music)
21st-century British male musicians